Taj Mohammed is a citizen of Afghanistan who was held in extrajudicial detention in the United States Guantanamo Bay detention camps, in Cuba.
His Guantanamo Internment Serial Number was 902.
Joint Task Force Guantanamo counter-terrorism analysts estimate Mohammed was born in 1981.
He was repatriated in 2006.

According to Washington Post reporter, Mahvish Khan, who visited Taj Mohammed in detention with habeas counsel, he learned English within his four years of detention.

Press reports
According to the Associated Press the allegations against Nasir, in his Combatant Status Review Tribunal,
was accused of being a member of Lashkar-e-Tayyiba -- The Army of the Pure.

Mohammed told his Tribunal: "I was a shepherd, and I never can even go out very much, and I was always with my goats on the mountain, These are all lies about me."

On June 15, 2008, the McClatchy News Service published a series of articles based on interviews with 66 former Guantanamo captives.
Taj Mohammed
was one of the former captives who had an article profiling him.

Taj Mohammed reported being sexually harassed during his interrogations.
He reported that guards desecrated the Koran.
According to his McClatchy interviewer Taj Mohammed tried to retaliate:

According to the McClatchy profile of him Taj Mohammed was radicalized in Guantanamo and said he beat less religious captives.
The article said his lawyers, Paul Rashkind, was taken aback when told of these assertions, and questioned whether the McClatchy interviewer may have been taken in by an impostor.

According to the McClatchy interviewer, Taj Mohammed was mentored and given lessons in Arabic and the Koran by Yemeni captive Ali Abdullah Ahmed—one of the three men camp authorities reported committed suicide on June 10, 2006.

According to the McClatchy interviewer Taj Mohammed spent nine months in Camp four in 2005, the camp where "compliant" captives were allowed to mingle with other captives.  He was, however, demoted when he slapped a female doctor.

ABC News reported on February 22, 2010, that Taj Mohammed was employed by the Agribusiness Development Team, a Provincial Reconstruction Team development project with participation from the US military.
He works as a translator.  He is reported to be surprisingly fluent in both English and Spanish—learned in Guantanamo.

Namesakes

On January 16, 2010, the Department of Defense was forced to publish the names of the 645 captives held in the Bagram Theater Internment Facility.
One of the individuals on the list was named Taj Mohammed.

References

External links
The Stories of the Afghans Just Released from Guantánamo: Intelligence Failures, Battlefield Myths and Unaccountable Prisons in Afghanistan (Part Two) Andy Worthington
McClatchy News Service - video

Afghan extrajudicial prisoners of the United States
Living people
Bagram Theater Internment Facility detainees
Guantanamo detainees known to have been released
Year of birth uncertain
1981 births